Bactris cubensis is a species of palm endemic to the Nipe-Baracoa Massif and eastern Sierra Maestra in eastern Cuba at elevations between 40 and 700 metres above sea level.  B. cubensis trees grow 2.7 to 6.4 m tall in clumps of 6 to 12 stems.

According to Salzman and Judd, B. cubensis forms a clade with B. plumeriana and B. jamaicana, the other Greater Antillean Bactris species.

References

cubensis
Trees of Cuba
Endemic flora of Cuba
Taxa named by Max Burret